A garce is an obsolete unit of measurement. 

In India, a garce was a unit of dry volume approximately equal to 5,244 litres (149 US bushels). In Sri Lanka, it was approximately 5,084.8 litres  (144.29447 US bushels). 

A garce was also a unit of mass in Sri Lanka approximately equal to 4,198.518 kg (9,256.130 lb). After metrication by both countries in the mid-20th century, the unit became obsolete.

See also
List of customary units of measurement in South Asia

References

Units of volume
Units of mass
Customary units in India
Obsolete units of measurement